Count Hermann Karl von Keyserling (1697–1764) was a Russian diplomat from the Keyserlingk family of Baltic German nobility based in the Duchy of Courland and Semigallia.

Life 
In 1733, the nobility of Courland sent Keyserling to Saint Petersburg in order to inform Ernst Johann von Biron that he had been elected Duke of Courland. Biron was so pleased with the news that he had Keyserlingk appointed President of the Saint Petersburg Academy of Sciences.

A year later, Keyserling was appointed Ambassador of the Russian Empire at the court of August III in Dresden and Warsaw. He kept this position until his death. As the Russian ambassador to the imperial court in Vienna he was made an imperial count in 1744.

Johann Sebastian Bach was said by his first biographer, Johann Nikolaus Forkel, to have composed the Goldberg Variations for Count Keyserling as a sleep aid. The work takes its name from Johann Gottlieb Goldberg, a musician in the service of Count Keyserling.

His son Heinrich Christian von Keyserling was the wealthiest aristocrat of Königsberg, whose palace was frequented by the likes of Immanuel Kant and Johann Gottfried Herder. His marriage to Caroline von Keyserling was childless.

Hermann Karl's daughter Anna von Medem was the great-grandmother of geologist Alexander Keyserling.

1697 births
1764 deaths
People from the Duchy of Courland and Semigallia
Baltic-German people
Ambassadors of the Russian Empire to Austria
Ambassadors of the Russian Empire to Prussia
Full members of the Saint Petersburg Academy of Sciences
18th-century German historians
Politicians of the Russian Empire
18th-century diplomats
German male non-fiction writers
Active Privy Councillor (Russian Empire)
Ambassadors of the Russian Empire to Poland